Eugenia of Rome (died c AD 258) was an early Christian Roman martyr whose feast day is celebrated on December 25 in the Roman Catholic Church, on December 24 (January 6, New Style) in the Eastern Orthodox Church, and on January 23 in the Armenian Apostolic Church. She is included in the Golden Legend.

Legend
Her legend states that she was converted by and martyred with Protus and Hyacinth, her Chamberlains, during the persecution of Valerian. She was said to have been the daughter of Philip, "duke" of Alexandria and governor of Egypt. She had fled her father's house dressed in men's clothing and was baptized by Helenus, bishop of Heliopolis. She later became an abbot, still pretending to be a man. As the story goes, while she was an abbot and still dressing like a man, she cured a woman of an illness, and when the woman made sexual advances, which she rebuffed, the woman accused her publicly of adultery. She was taken to court, where, still disguised, she faced her father as the judge. At the trial, her real female identity was revealed and she was exonerated. Her father converted to the faith and became Bishop of Alexandria but the emperor had him executed for this. Eugenia and her remaining household moved to Rome where she converted many, especially maidens, but this did not prevent their martyrdom. Protus and Hyacinth were beheaded on September 11, 258, and Eugenia followed suit after Christ appeared to her in a dream and told her that she would die on the Feast of the Nativity. She was beheaded on December 25, 258.

Legacy

There is a small village in the north of Portugal with the name of Santa Eugenia that contains a church with a painting of Saint Eugenia dressed as a boy in Roman-era attire. A local legend states that Eugenia passed through this area on a nearby Roman road and through Moure, which lies at a major intersection of ancient Roman roads. There is also a tomb dating from about 1000 AD in the city of Barcelos, high on a hill that reads "tomb of Saint Eugenia." It is possible that this tomb is the tomb of Eugenia. During the Middle Ages, some saints were moved from Rome to the outer parts of Europe by monks. Patrick J. Geary, in his work Furta Sacra, states that "on April 5, 838, a monk named Felix appeared at Fulda with the remains of Saints Cornelius, Callistus, Agapitus, Georgius, Vincentius, Maximus, Cecilia, Eugenia, Digna, Emerita, and Columbana."

Notes

External links

The Life and Martyrdom of St. Eugenia, Virgin and Martyr of the Christian Church
St. Eugenia of Rome (St Luke's Orthodox Church)
Icon of Saint Eugenia
Catholic Online
Catholic Forum: Saint Eugenia
Here Begin the Lives of SS. Prothus, Jacinctus, and Eugenia from Caxton's translation of the Golden Legend
Saint Eugenia at the Christian Iconography web site
 Albani, Jenny P. Beyond the Borders of Femininity: St. Eugenia and St. Athanasia in Byzantine and Post-Byzantine Art. Actual Problems of Theory and History of Art: Collection of articles. Vol. 9. Ed: A. V. Zakharova, S. V. Maltseva, E. Iu. Staniukovich-Denisova. Lomonosov Moscow State University / St. Petersburg: NP-Print, 2019, pp. 306–317. ISSN 2312-2129.

3rd-century Roman women
258 deaths
3rd-century Christian martyrs
Year of birth unknown
Cross-dressing saints